Sandrine Testud (born 3 April 1972) is a former professional tennis player from France.

Career
Testud broke into top 20 singles rankings in July 1997. On February 7, 2000, she became the sixth Frenchwoman after Françoise Dürr, Mary Pierce, Nathalie Tauziat, Amélie Mauresmo and Julie Halard to break into the top 10 in the singles rankings. This marked the first time France had four women ranked in the singles top 10 simultaneously (Mary Pierce at No. 5, Nathalie Tauziat at No. 6, Julie Halard at No. 8 and Testud at No. 9). France was  the third nation after the USA and Australia to have more than two representatives in the singles top 10 at any one time. She finished in the top 20 for five consecutive years between 1997 and 2001. In the summer of 2002, she took a break from the tour when she discovered that she was pregnant with her first child. She resumed her career 12 months after the birth of her child and retired in the summer of 2005.

She won a total of three singles and four doubles titles on the WTA Tour. Her biggest singles tournament victory was at the 1998 Tier-II tournament in Filderstadt, Germany, where she defeated world No. 2, Lindsay Davenport, in the final. She was the runner-up in singles and doubles WTA tournaments on seven occasions each. Her third career-title victory that came in Hawaii over Justine Henin happened in a final that was delayed for a day due to the terrorist attacks on the U.S. on September 11, 2001. Her last WTA Tour singles final was in Dubai where she lost to Amélie Mauresmo in what was the fourth all-French final in WTA Tour history. She has gone beyond the fourth round of a Grand Slam tournament on two occasions: she reached the quarterfinals at the 1997 US Open and the 1998 Australian Open. Testud played in the season-ending Tour Championships for five consecutive years from 1997 to 2001; reaching the singles semifinal and doubles quarterfinal in her last appearance in 2001.

In 1999, Testud was the women's doubles runner-up at the US Open with Chanda Rubin, and she reached the women's doubles quarterfinals or better in six Grand Slam tournaments. She was a doubles semifinalist on 21 WTA Tour occasions, excluding Grand Slam tournaments: 1991 (2), 1992 (2), 1993 (1), 1994 (1), 1995 (1), 1996 (4), 1997 (2), 1998 (1), 2000 (3), 2001 (2), 2002 (1), 2005 (1).

Testud represented her country in the Fed Cup between 1997 and 2002. She won her second singles match against the host country Netherlands to give France an unassailable 3–1 lead in the 1997 Fed Cup final in Den Bosch. That was the first time France had won the Fed Cup. She also represented her country in the 2004 Olympic Games in Athens, where she lost in the singles first round and reached the doubles QF with Nathalie Dechy.

Testud married her coach, Vittorio Magnelli, on 13 June 1998. Their daughter, Isabella, was born on 19 February 2003. Their second child, Sophie, was born in 2006.

WTA career finals

Singles: 10 (3 titles, 7 runner-ups)

Doubles: 11 (4 titles, 7 runner-ups)

ITF finals

Singles (5–0)

Doubles (4–2)

Grand Slam singles performance timeline

Head-to-head record
 Anke Huber 2-5
 Martina Hingis 0-16
 Lindsay Davenport 2-12
 Silvia Farina Elia 2-5
 Anna Kournikova 0-3

References

External links
 
 
 

French female tennis players
1972 births
Living people
Olympic tennis players of France
Tennis players at the 2004 Summer Olympics
Tennis players from Lyon
Hopman Cup competitors
20th-century French women
21st-century French women